Botuli Bompunga (born 30 January 1999) is a Congolese professional footballer who plays as a defender.

International career

International goals
Scores and results list DR Congo's goal tally first.

References

External links 
 

1992 births
Living people
Democratic Republic of the Congo footballers
Democratic Republic of the Congo international footballers
Association football midfielders
21st-century Democratic Republic of the Congo people
Expatriate footballers in Jordan
Jordanian Pro League players
Al-Hussein SC (Irbid) players
2016 African Nations Championship players
Democratic Republic of the Congo A' international footballers
Democratic Republic of the Congo expatriate footballers
Democratic Republic of the Congo expatriate sportspeople in Jordan
Democratic Republic of the Congo expatriate sportspeople in Oman
AS Vita Club players
Expatriate footballers in Oman
Expatriate footballers in Morocco
Democratic Republic of the Congo expatriate sportspeople in Morocco
MC Oujda players
Saham SC players
Democratic Republic of the Congo expatriate sportspeople in the Republic of the Congo
Expatriate footballers in the Republic of the Congo